Tel Quel (translated into English as, variously: "as is," "as such," or "unchanged") was a French avant-garde literary magazine published between 1960 and 1982.

History and profile
Tel Quel was founded in 1960 in Paris by Philippe Sollers and Jean-Edern Hallier and published by Éditions du Seuil. Important essays working towards post-structuralism and deconstruction appeared here. Publication ceased in 1982, and the journal was succeeded by L'Infini under Sollers's continued editorship.

Though the journal originally published essays more in line with what current literary theory calls "structuralism," it would eventually feature work that reflected the revaluation of literary, artistic, and music criticism that began in France in the 1960s.

The editors committee included Philippe Sollers, Jean-Edern Hallier, Jean-René Huguenin, Jean Ricardou, Jean Thibaudeau, Michel Deguy, Marcelin Pleynet, Denis Roche, Jean-Louis Baudry, Jean-Pierre Faye, Jacqueline Risset, François Wahl, and Julia Kristeva (married to Philippe Sollers since 1967).

Authors and collaborators include Roland Barthes, Michel Foucault, Maurice Blanchot, Pierre Boulez, Jacques Derrida, Jean Cayrol, Jean-Pierre Faye, Shoshana Felman, Pierre Guyotat, Julia Kristeva, Bernard-Henri Lévy, Marcelin Pleynet, Dominique Rolin, Severo Sarduy, Philippe Sollers, Philippe-Joseph Salazar, Tzvetan Todorov, Francis Ponge, Umberto Eco, Gérard Genette. 
   
In 1971 the journal broke with the French Communist Party and declared its support for Maoism. In 1974 the editorial members Philippe Sollers, Marcelin Pleynet, François Wahl, Roland Barthes and Julia Kristeva visited China. The trip, which was tightly organized by Chinese government officials, would later be processed in several essays and books by the participants. In the autumn of 1976 the journal explicitly distanced itself from Maoism.

References

Further reading
 Patrick Ffrench and Roland-François Lack (eds.), The Tel Quel Reader (London: Routledge, 1998)
 Patrick Ffrench, The Time of Theory: A History of Tel Quel (1960-1983) (Oxford: Clarendon Press, 1995)
 Philippe Forest, Histoire de Tel quel: 1960-1982 (Éditions du Seuil, 1995)
 Niilo Kauppi, The Making of an Avant-Garde: Tel Quel (Mouton de Gruyter, 1994)

External links
Interview with the Tel Quel founding group (video, 6 April 1963).
Tel Quel - Notities bij Het plezier van de tekst from taalfilosofie.nl (in Dutch)
Plus à propos de Tel Quel sur pileface.com/sollers  (in French)

1960 establishments in France
1982 disestablishments in France
Avant-garde magazines
Communist magazines
Defunct literary magazines published in France
French-language magazines
Literary circles
Magazines established in 1960
Magazines disestablished in 1982
Magazines published in Paris